General Rudzani Maphwanya (born 23 November 1960) is a South African military commander who served as Chief of Joint Operations from 2019 till May 2021. He was appointed Chief of the South African National Defence Force (SANDF) on 1 June 2021.

Military career
Maphwanya served in the uMkhonto we Sizwe (MK) in Angola and integrated into the SANDF in 1994. He served as SO1 Operations, SSO Operations SF Bde, CoS Special Forces Brigade, GOC SA Army Infantry Formation HQ, Chief Joint Operations Division. He was appointed as the SANDF Chief Joint Operations on 1 November 2019.

Awards and decorations

Medals

Military Qualifications

Academic Qualifications

References

|-

1960 births
South African Army generals
Living people
UMkhonto we Sizwe personnel